The Collection de l'art brut (literally "Collection of Raw Art"; sometimes referred to as "Musée de l'art brut") is a museum dedicated to outsider art located in Lausanne, Switzerland.

See also 
 American Visionary Art Museum

Notes and references

External links 

  Official website
 Conservation of unusual cultural treasures in Switzerland 

Museums in Lausanne
Outsider art
Art museums and galleries in Switzerland